Josef Hamberger (born 20 July 1930) is an Austrian former boxer. He competed in the men's light middleweight event at the 1952 Summer Olympics.

References

External links
 

1930 births
Possibly living people
Austrian male boxers
Olympic boxers of Austria
Boxers at the 1952 Summer Olympics
Place of birth missing (living people)
Light-middleweight boxers